Sergo Kobuladze (February 7, 1909 – July 22, 1978) was a Soviet and Georgian painter and illustrator. He was a rector of the Tbilisi State Academy of Arts (1952-1959)

From 1918 he went to N. Sklifasovski Art Studio; in 1925-1939 – to Tbilisi Academy of Arts. The years spent in Moscow and Leningrad in the early 1930s had a great impact on the artist's professional development. From 1932 Sergo Kobuladze efficiently worked for the Tbilisi Kote Marjanishvili and Shota Rustaveli Theatres, Tbilisi Zakaria Paliashvili Opera and Ballet State Theatre and for Moscow's Bolshoi Theatre. In 1938 Sergo Kobuladze started teaching activity in Tbilisi Academy of Arts, where he founded and headed the Department of Painting and in 1953-1958 he became the Rector of the State Academy of Arts. After many years of work, in 1961 he completed the iconic painted stage curtain (170 sq. m) for Zakaria Paliashvili Opera and Ballet State Theatre. In 1973 fire completely destroyed the hand-painted curtain.

References

External links
A gallery of his paintings
Another gallery

1909 births
1978 deaths
20th-century painters from Georgia (country)
People from Akhaltsikhe
Communist Party of the Soviet Union members
Tbilisi State Academy of Arts alumni
Stalin Prize winners
Rustaveli Prize winners

Recipients of the Order of the Red Banner of Labour
Socialist realist artists
Painters from Georgia (country)
Scenic designers from Georgia (country)
Soviet painters
Soviet scenic designers
Burials at Didube Pantheon